Claude El Hajal is a Lebanese diplomat currently serving as Lebanese Ambassador Extraordinary and Plenipotentiary to the Republic of Cyprus.

Education 
Hajal holds a bachelor’s degree in Administrative and Political Science.

Career 
She started her diplomatic career as Secretary at the Lebanese Embassy in Jordan and later transferred to Serbia as Charge d'Affairs. She served at the Lebanese Embassy in Egypt as Counselor before being appointed Lebanon Ambassador to Ukraine in 2013. She was redeployed to the Republic of Cyprus in November 2017 and presented her letter of credence to President Nicos Anastasiades on 1 December 2017.

References 

Lebanese diplomats
21st-century Lebanese women